The midparent value is defined as the average of the trait value of father and a scaled version of the mother. This value can be used in the study to analyze the data set without heeding sex effects. Studying quantitative traits in heritability studies may be complicated by sex differences observed for the trait. 

Well-known examples include studies of stature height, whose midparent value hmp is given by:

where hf and hm are, respectively, the father's and mother's heights. 
The coefficient 1.08 serves as a scaling factor. After the 1.08 scaling, the mean of the mother's height is the same as that of the father's, and the variance is closer to the father's; in this way, sex difference can be ignored.

References

Genetics